Pavel Yevteyev (born 23 June 1967) is a retired football midfielder from Kazakhstan. He obtained 16 caps for the Kazakhstan national football team during his career, scoring three goals.

Career statistics

International goals

References

External links

playerhistory

1967 births
Living people
Kazakhstani footballers
Kazakhstan international footballers
Association football midfielders
Footballers at the 1998 Asian Games
FC Zhenis Astana players
Kazakhstani people of Russian descent
Asian Games competitors for Kazakhstan